Lahore, being the richest cultural city in Pakistan, celebrates a number of festivals throughout the year. It is most popular for the festivals of Basant and Mela Chiraghan, but many others are celebrated in the metropolis as well.

Jashn-e-Baharaann (Basant) 

The biggest, or perhaps the best known, festival is that of Jashn-e-Baharaan held in February each year. It is a Punjabi festival celebrating the onset of the spring season and is also called the Basant Festival of kites. This festival is celebrated with kite flying competitions all over the city especially in the Androon-E-Shehr (The Inner City or the Walled City) area. Every year the sky is filled with colorful kites of all shapes and sizes flown from rooftops. The kites are flown on strings called “Dorr” which is a special thread with cut glass embedded within which serves to cut the thread of competitor kites more effectively. Some of the kite-flying competitions get extremely competitive and serious. Women, on this day are seen wearing a bright yellow dress up to the hilt. This festival gained more and more importance over the years and used to attract people from all over the world. But since 2007, it has been banned due to deaths associated with the kites strangling people.

Mela Chiraghan

Mela Chiraghan or Mela Shalamar (Festival of Lights) is a three-day annual festival to mark the urs (death anniversary) of the Punjabi Sufi poet and saint Shah Hussain. It takes place at the shrine of Shah Hussain in Baghbanpura, on the outskirts of Lahore, Pakistan, adjacent to the Shalimar Gardens. The festival used to take place in the Shalimar Gardens also, until President Ayub Khan ordered against it in 1958.
The festival used to be the largest festival in the Punjab, but now comes second to Basant.

National Horse and Cattle Show
The show is held at Fortress Stadium in the third week of November for 5 days. Activities in the event include cattle races, cattle dances, tent pegging, tattoo show, folk music, dances, bands, cultural floats and folk games.

The show has been described as an eloquent expression of Pakistan's heritage and an authentic account of its agricultural and industrial achievement's. The fortress stadium, the venue of the show is thronged by active participants, foreign visitors and peoples who watch the festival with great enthusiasm, verve and aplomb. A large number of them are interested in watching and appreciating the best breeds of livestock. Many derive pleasure by watching other activities such as the display parade of animals, dances by horses and camels, polo matches, dog shows and their races, vaudeville acts of stuntmen, the mass display of the military band, rhythmical physical exercise by the children, decorated industrial floats and torch light tattoo shows. Additional attractions include a subtle interplay of lights to weave enticing patterns at night and breath taking acts by foreign groups. The show began as a modest exhibition organized by the army to project the cattle wealth of the country in the early fifties.

Pakistan is an agricultural country and its prosperity depends on agriculture and livestock. The cattle show provides incentives to the farmers to develop agriculture and livestock. The cattle show encourages the farmers to graze their animals.

Today it is an international event to which come dignitaries from abroad and visitors and foreign tourists. The organizing committee comprises representatives of a number of agencies including army, rangers, LMC schools, the police, industrialists and the art councils.

World Performing Arts Festival

The World Performing Arts Festival is held every autumn (usually in November) at the Alhamra Arts Council, a large venue consisting of several theatres and amphitheatres. This ten-day festival consists of musicals, theatre, concerts, dances, solos, mime and puppet shows. The festival has an international flavour with nearly 80 percent of the shows performed by international performers. On average 15-20 different shows are performed every day of the festival.

Literature

==Lahore International Conference on Culture==

The Lahore Literary Festival has been organized by Youth Revolution Clan & Cultural Infusion Australia every year since 2014 and was founded by Mr. Rizwan Anwar.
Culture is a set of rules and behavioral patterns we learn with socialization. However, in a globalized (and multicultural) world culture became a subject of discussion from various points of view, and its importance is not losing strength. In the past century, we witnessed many attempts to foster cultural agendas using popular culture where identities were formed to present one nation to other nations in a favorable way, and where audiences were confronted with various messages that are sometimes blurred with first-hand experiences. States indeed invest funding in their cultural policies, particularly in their cultural policies oriented towards abroad via external cultural institutes, or tourist offers where culture is emphasized as an achievement of a particular nation (most notably, in art and music).

Cultural relations, on the other hand, are centered on creating mutual recognition and understanding, however, many scholars and practitioners expressed criticism calling western countries imperialists imposing their cultural patterns over less advanced countries just via peaceful means and not through colonialism anymore. On the other hand, culture is often a subject of discussion when minority groups are at stake because minorities find themselves surrounded by different cultures, and in a dilemma of whether to assimilate or preserve their culture while still trying to lead average lives. The latter is then the subject of criticism from conservatives and the Far Right that insist on integration, an unclear term that sometimes seems more like forced integration.

Papers and Research articles on the following topics are also invited for publication and presentation.

Conference Theme and Discussion Topics:

• The Role of Culture in the Implementation of The 2030 Agenda For Sustainable Development.
• Multicultural Cities: The Challenges of Urban Governance.
• Culture and Nationalism: Accepting Cultural Diversity.
• Religion and Culture for Interfaith Harmony.
• Cultural Diplomacy for Sustainable Development.
• Intangible Cultural Heritage.
• Culture and Media.

Objectives of The Conference:

Share experiences and propose strategic recommendations to strengthen culture-based sustainable development initiatives at the international, national, regional, and local levels;

Present and discuss the draft Cultural Policy of Pakistan- for Sustainable Development in the context of implementing the 2030 Agenda for Sustainable Development.

Creating the Cultural Identity of Pakistan all over the world

Portraying the positive, peaceful, and soft image of Pakistan

Proposed Speakers:

High-level representatives of Governments and International Organizations, internationally renowned experts, representatives of the private sector, Universities, and non-governmental organizations from Australia, Germany, Switzerland, India, Sri Lanka, Jordan, Mexico, Costa Rica, Malaysia, Singapore, Bangladesh, United States of America, Turkey, Greece, Cyprus, Denmark, and Norway.

Expected Outcomes:

• The Lahore Outcomes: Recommendations on maximizing the role of culture to achieve sustainable development and effective ways of integrating culture in planning and regeneration of policies and creative economy and quality of life.
• An international platform to share challenges, best practices, and case studies on the preservation and redevelopment of the Cultural Diplomacy of Pakistan.
• Strategic input to finalize the Youth Exchange Program with partner countries to strengthen the culture, and share the values and traditions at International levels.

International
Teachers' day
Students' day
Valentine's Day

Women's Excellence Awards
This event is a celebration of women who are geniuses, leaders, inspiring, & have overcome the most extreme adversity – The event aims to recognize the achievements of Top Women Inspiring the youth through their Achievements.

The First Ever Women's Excellence Awards are Organized by Youth Revolution Clan and Kinnaird College for Women.
Awardees Include:
 Dr. Rukhsana David (Principal Kinnaird College)
 Dr. Fauzia Viqar  (Chairperson Commission on Status for Women Government of the Punjab)
 Sabah Sadiq (Minister for Social Welfare)
 Ms. Sadia Naseem Ghazala (Deputy Director Anti Corruption)
 Syeda Henna Babar Ali (Social worker, poet, writer, Advisor, Consumer Products Division, Packages Limited)
 Ms. Farhat Mashhood (CEO Zoha Foundation)
 Khawer Sultana (Akhuwat Foundation)
 Sabahat Rafique (CEO United We Reach)
 Sowaba Shehzad (President Women German Chamber of Commerce)
 Musarat Misbah (CEO Depilux)
 Dr. Shehla Javed Akram
 Afshan Sultan (Hayyat Foundation)
 Dr. Sadaf Attique
 Maha Jamil (Chairperson YRC)
 Shameelah Ismail (CEO Ghar Par)

The event is founded by  Mr.  Rizwan Anwar (Chairman Youth Revolution Clan)], Maha Jamil (Co-Chair YRC) and Ms. Sair S. Farooqi (Head of Business Studies Department Kinnaird College). The event was co-organized by Mehwish Haroon (President Kinnaird Entrepreneurial Club) with Asfand Yar Naseer (President YRC) .Official Partners Include United We Reach, HospitAll, Hayat Foundation and Azeem raza Photography.

National

Pakistan Day (23 March): A military parade takes place to commemorate the anniversary of the Pakistan Resolution passed on March 23, 1940.
Independence Day (14 August): Meetings, processions, rallies, decorations, and illustrations.
Defence Day (6 September): Parades and exhibitions of military equipment. Visits to the war memorials.
Air Force Day (7 September): Display of the latest aircraft of the Pakistan Air Force and air shows.

Religious
Eid ul-Fitr
Eid ul-Adha
Eid Milad-un-Nabi
Shab-e-Barat
Ashura
Vaisakhi
Christmas

Others
National Industrial Exhibition Lahore (3rd week of November for 15 days): Held at Fortress Stadium, Lahore. Exhibition and sale of industrial products and handicrafts of Pakistan.
Punjab Sports Festival, a divisional level annual sports festival.
Faiz Ahmad Faiz Mela/Festival .In honor of the late poet Faiz.
Ali Arshad Mir Mela/Festival. In honor of epic Punjabi Poet Prof. Ali Arshad Mir.

References

Festivals in Punjab, Pakistan
Culture in Lahore
Lahore
Lahore